Yoann Richomme (born 12 July 1983 in Frejus) is a French navigator, sailor and yacht skipper. He is a double winner of the Solitaire du Figaro and won the 2018 and the 2022 Route du Rhum in the Class 40 category.

Career 
Richomme studied as a naval architect at Southampton Solent University, and was later was involved in the development of the Beneteau Figaro 3 yacht.

He is seeking to compete in the 2024 Vendée Globe event.

On 4 February 2020 it was announced that Richomme will skipper the Mirpuri Foundation Racing Team's 'Racing for the Planet' boat in the 2021 running of The Ocean Race. As such, Richomme will skipper the Mirpuri Foundation Racing Team's first full team entry in the race, having previously had involvement in the Turn the Tide on Plastic entry in the 2018 race.

Racing record

Figaro Class

Class 40

IMOCA 60

IRC

Farr 30

J80

References

External links
 Yoann Richomme at IMOCA
 
 

1983 births
Living people
Sportspeople from Fréjus
French male sailors (sport)
Alumni of Solent University